Ronen Shilo (born May 1, 1958) is an Israeli entrepreneur and software engineer. In 2005 Shilo founded and served as CEO of Conduit, Israel’s first unicorn and largest internet company in 2013, valued at $1.3 billion.[4][5]. 

In early 2019, Shilo stepped down from his role as CEO at Conduit and quickly founded his fifth company, Head Ventures. As a private investment firm and innovation lab focusing on design and technology, Head Ventures is home to three companies: Motiva, Klydoclock, and Lyba.  Motiva, where Shilo also serves as CEO & CTO, brings a new element to design using art, technology, and words to create Philosophical Art. 
Klydoclock is an innovative mantle clock that displays animations and video art. Lyba is a non-profit organization with a mission to create equality in the workplace, specifically promoting the direct employment of cleaning workers in hi-tech companies and organizations.

Business career
Early in his career, Shilo worked for Ready Systems in Silicon Valley.

In 1995, he founded DoubleAgent. Nine months later the company was acquired by software company NetManage. Ronen served as manager of its Tel Aviv branch  before leaving in 1999 to start Effective-I, a learning system for corporate use.

Shilo founded Conduit in 2005 with partners Gaby Bilcyzk and Dror Erez to help publishers retain and engage users. Though the company has received venture funding, the three founders retain a majority share in the company.

In the Financial Times, he called the phenomena of Israeli companies selling too early as "Quick Sell" nation. Israeli newspaper Haaretz mentioned him in the article "Four Reasons Not to Hate Israel's Big Business Tycoons" as one of a small number of Israeli tech CEOs who "shunned the quick buck of an M&A deal and stayed the course."  He wrote an article for Fast Company in 2012 explaining why he had largely stayed out of the press despite running an Internet company with 260 million users.

In 2013, the company announced it would spin off its client-connect business unit and merge it with Perion Networks and in 2014 the acquisition was complete. With a focus on mobile, Conduit became Como (Conduit Mobile) and continued to enable publishers and content providers to deepen their connection and extend the reach to users using innovative technologies. 

In 2019, Ronen founded Head Ventures. The company invests in a wide array of early-stage ideas and initiatives from various disciplines, encouraging out-of-the-box thinking and ingenuity. In addition, the company is developing further original in-house projects and creating products that give people an incredible experience.

Head Ventures deals with investment and also in-house products and initiatives such as:

Motiva - The concept of Motiva is rooted in its power to convey a powerful message in a limited space while upholding the delicate balance between art and technology. In 2019, A propriety algorithm for Motiva was developed by Ronen as a result of his love for quotes and deep appreciation for design and aesthetics which was then fully realized into a multi-faceted product fusing art, design, and technology.
Motiva was granted a patent on its concept that takes a set of quotes that represent an idea, theme, or a specific figure and displays them in an innovative and meaningful way.
Recognized as a ‘philosophical art’ on your wall, Motiva was designed into a multi-faceted product in collaboration with Pentagram. An original ‘Motiva Font’ was exclusively designed by Ben Nathan and his team at Pentagram. Motiva has had the privilege of collaborating with renowned names such as Warren Buffett, Diane Von Furstenberg, Prof. Aaron Ciechanover, Prof. Dan Ariely and many more.

Klydo - KlydoClock is an innovative mantle clock that displays animations and video art. It is the first clock that incorporates digital art as an integral part of its time-reading experience. Klydo works with a vast range of animators and digital artists to create the most innovative and enthralling experience for its users.

Lyba -Lyba is a non-profit organization with a mission to create equality in the workplace, specifically promoting the direct employment of cleaning workers in hi-tech companies and organizations.

Early life and education
Ronen Shilo grew up in Ness Ziona and served as an officer in the Israel Defense Forces. where 

He graduated from the Technion, the Israeli Institute of Technology, with a BSc in Computer Science.

Personal life
Shilo is married and has three children. He spent four memorable years living in silicon valley, where he worked for Ready Systems, and still maintains many friendships from those days. In 2013, he told Inc. Magazine that his company's billion-dollar valuation had not changed his lifestyle and that he and his family still lived in the same home.
Ronen is an avid tennis enthusiast and collector of vintage and rare products such as cameras, radios, computers, typewriters, and their accompanying vintage print advertisements.

References

1958 births
Living people
Israeli businesspeople
Technion – Israel Institute of Technology alumni